Beauty Revealed is an 1828 self-portrait by the American artist Sarah Goodridge, a watercolor portrait miniature on a piece of ivory. Depicting only the artist's bared breasts surrounded by white cloth, the  painting, originally backed with paper, is now in a modern frame. Goodridge, aged forty when she completed the miniature, depicts breasts that appear imbued with a "balance, paleness, and buoyancy" by the harmony of light, color, and balance. The surrounding cloth draws the viewer to focus on them, leading to the body being "erased".

Goodridge gave the portrait to statesman Daniel Webster, who was a frequent subject and possibly a lover, following the death of his wife; she may have intended to provoke him into marrying her. Although Webster married someone else, his family held onto the portrait until the 1980s, when it was auctioned at Christie's and acquired by Gloria and Richard Manney in 1981. The couple donated or sold the miniatures of their art collection, including Beauty Revealed, to the Metropolitan Museum of Art in 2006.

Description and context
Beauty Revealed is a self-portrait by Sarah Goodridge, depicting her bared breasts, pink nipples,  and a beauty mark. These are presented in a gradation of color, giving a three-dimensional effect. Although Goodridge was aged forty when she painted this miniature, according to art critic Chris Packard her breasts seem younger, with a "balance, paleness, and buoyancy" which is imbued in part by the harmony of light, color, and balance. The breasts are framed by a swirl of pale cloth, which in parts reflects the light.

The  painting is set in a case; it had originally been installed on a paper backing which had the date "1828" on the reverse. The work is a watercolor painting on ivory, thin enough for light to shine through and thus allow the depicted breasts to "glow". This medium was common for American miniatures, but in this case also served as a simile for the flesh presented upon it.

Beauty Revealed was completed during a period of popularity of portrait miniatures, a medium which had been introduced in the United States in the late 18th century. By the time Goodridge completed her self-portrait, miniatures were increasing in complexity and vibrance. The Heilbrunn Timeline of Art History describes Beauty Revealed as a play on the eye miniatures which were then popular as tokens of affection in England and France, but not common in the US. Such miniatures allowed portraits of loved ones to be carried by their suitors without revealing the sitters' identities.

History

Goodridge was a prolific Boston-based portrait miniature painter who had studied under Gilbert Stuart and Elkanah Tisdale. She had a long-term association with  Daniel Webster, a politician who began services as senator from Massachusetts in 1827. Webster sent her more than forty letters between 1827 and 1851, and in time, his greetings to her became increasingly familiar; his last letters were addressed to "My dear, good friend", which was uncharacteristic of his usual writing style. She, meanwhile, painted him more than a dozen times and left her hometown of Boston to visit him in Washington, D.C. at least twice, once in 1828 after his first wife's death and again in 1841–42, when Webster was separated from his second wife.

Goodridge completed Beauty Revealed in 1828, likely from looking at herself in a mirror. Several works have been cited as possible inspirations, including John Vanderlyn's Ariadne Asleep on the Island of Naxos and Horatio Greenough's sculpture Venus Victrix. Goodridge sent her portrait to Webster when he was a new widower, and, based on its miniature format, it was likely intended for his eyes alone. The American art critic John Updike suggests that the artist intended it to offer herself to Webster; he writes that the bared breasts appear to say "We are yours for the taking, in all our ivory loveliness, with our tenderly stippled nipples". Ultimately, however, Webster married another, wealthier woman.

After Webster's death, Beauty Revealed continued to be handed down by his family, together with another self-portrait Goodridge had sent to him. The politician's descendants held that Goodridge and Webster had been engaged. The painting was eventually auctioned through Christie's, with a list price of $15,000, and passed through Alexander Gallery of New York later that year before being purchased by New York-based collectors Gloria Manney and her husband Richard. The couple included Beauty Revealed in the exhibition "Tokens of Affection: The Portrait Miniature in America" in 1991, which toured to the Metropolitan Museum of Art (Met) in New York, the National Museum of American Art in Washington, D.C., and the Art Institute of Chicago.

Beauty Revealed was one of more than three hundred portrait miniatures compiled by the couple, who gave it to the Met in 2006, as part of a gift/purchase arrangement of their collection. Carrie Rebora Barratt and Lori Zabar of the Met describe Goodridge's self-portrait as the most compelling of the "strange and wonderful" miniatures by minor artists in the collection. Two years later, Beauty Revealed was included in a retrospective, "The Philippe de Montebello Years: Curators Celebrate Three Decades of Acquisitions", which showcased works acquired under the tenure of retiring Met director Philippe de Montebello. Holland Cotter of The New York Times highlighted Goodridge's self-portrait, describing it as "remarkable". In 2009, authors Jane Kamensky and Jill Lepore drew inspiration from Beauty Revealed (as well as other paintings, such as John Singleton Copley's Boy with a Squirrel) for their novel Blindspot. , the Met's website lists Beauty Revealed as not on display.

Analysis
Art historian Dale Johnson described Beauty Revealed as "strikingly realistic", demonstrative of Goodridge's ability to portray nuanced lights and shadows. She found the stippling and hatching used in creating the painting to be delicate. Writing in Antiques in 2012, Randall L. Holton and Charles A. Gilday said that the painting continued to present a self that evokes a "frisson of erotic possibility".

Packard wrote that Beauty Revealed served as a sort of visual synecdoche, representing the entirety of Goodridge through her breasts. As opposed to the "burdened" 1845 self-portrait and the non-eroticized one of 1830, he found Beauty Revealed to forefront Goodridge and her demand for attention. Arguing that the clothing surrounding her breasts served to indicate a performance (similar to the curtains of vaudeville), Packard described the viewer's eyes being focused on the breasts, while the rest of Goodridge's body was erased and abstracted. This, he stated, challenged the assumptions and stereotypes regarding the demure, homebound 19th-century woman.

References

Works cited

Further reading

1828 paintings
19th-century portraits
American paintings
Ivory works of art
Miniature painting
Nude art
Paintings in the collection of the Metropolitan Museum of Art
Portraits by American artists
Self-portraits
Watercolor paintings